Vladimír Růžička (born 6 June 1963) is a Czech ice hockey coach and former professional player. Růžička was twice named the top player in the Czechoslovak Elite League, and was on the gold medal team in the Ice Hockey World Championship in 1985 and 1998 Olympic Games. He also played 233 games in the National Hockey League (NHL). Since 2008, Růžička has been the head coach of both HC Slavia Praha and the Czech national ice hockey team.

Playing career
Růžička started his career with Czechoslovak side Litvínov, making his first appearance at the age of 16 and scoring after just 10 seconds in his first game, against Dukla Jihlava. Růžička was selected by the Toronto Maple Leafs 73rd overall in the 1982 NHL Entry Draft. Despite this, he was barred from leaving Czechoslovakia by the Communist authorities. He continued to play internationally for Czechoslovakia before finally making his NHL debut in 1989. Růžička had a short career in the NHL, playing a total of five seasons for the Edmonton Oilers, Boston Bruins and Ottawa Senators. His best season statistically came in 1991–92 when he recorded 75 points (39 goals, 36 assists) with Boston, and led the team in scoring. He has a Stanley Cup ring and is on the 1990 Edmonton Oilers Stanley Cup team picture. However, Růžička only played 25 regular season games and did not appear in the playoffs that season. Thus, his name was not engraved on the Stanley Cup. Růžička finished his NHL career with 233 games, scoring 82 goals and 85 assists.

Růžička played 200 games for his national team, scoring 112 goals in the process. In 1985, he won a gold medal with Czechoslovakia at the 1985 World Ice Hockey Championships. He captained the gold medal winning Czech Republic team at the 1998 Winter Olympics, going on to retire from the international team after the tournament.

Awards
 1985: World championship All-star team
 1986: Golden Hockey Stick
 1988: Golden Hockey Stick

Coaching career
After retiring as a player in 2000 he started working as a coach in HC Slavia Praha and in 2002–03 and 2007–08 seasons his team won the Czech Extraliga. Between 2002–2004 he was also an assistant coach of the Czech national ice hockey team. Shortly after he left the team, the head coach Ivan Hlinka died and Růžička took over the position, leading the Czech Republic team to the Vienna World Championship gold medal in 2005. Růžička has coached the Czech national ice hockey team to two gold medals.

Career statistics

Regular season and playoffs

International

References

External links

1963 births
Living people
Boston Bruins players
Czech ice hockey coaches
Czech ice hockey centres
Czech Republic men's national ice hockey team coaches
Czechoslovak ice hockey centres
Edmonton Oilers players
EV Zug players
HC Litvínov players
HK Dukla Trenčín players
HC Slavia Praha players
Ice hockey players at the 1984 Winter Olympics
Ice hockey players at the 1988 Winter Olympics
Ice hockey players at the 1998 Winter Olympics
Medalists at the 1998 Winter Olympics
Olympic gold medalists for the Czech Republic
Olympic ice hockey players of Czechoslovakia
Olympic ice hockey players of the Czech Republic
Olympic medalists in ice hockey
Ottawa Senators players
Sportspeople from Most (city)
Stanley Cup champions
Toronto Maple Leafs draft picks
Medalists at the 1984 Winter Olympics
Olympic silver medalists for Czechoslovakia
Czechoslovak expatriate sportspeople in Canada
Czechoslovak expatriate sportspeople in the United States
Czechoslovak expatriate ice hockey people
Czech expatriate ice hockey players in the United States
Czech expatriate ice hockey players in Canada
Czech expatriate ice hockey players in Switzerland